Khalia is a census town in Bally Jagachha CD Block of Howrah Sadar subdivision in Howrah district in the Indian state of West Bengal. It is a part of Kolkata Urban Agglomeration.

Khalia is under the jurisdiction of Liluah Police Station of Howrah City Police.

Geography

Demographics
As per 2011 Census of India Khalia had a total population of 6,265 of which 3,165 (51%) were males and 3,100 (49%) were females. Population below 6 years was 631. The total number of literates in Khalia was 4,696 (83.35% of the population over 6 years).

 India census, Khalia had a population of 4,957. Males constitute 52% of the population and females 48%. Khalia has an average literacy rate of 69%, higher than the national average of 59.5%: male literacy is 74% and female literacy is 62%. In Khalia, 11% of the population is under 6 years of age.

Transport
Khalia has the junction of Benaras Road and National Highway 16 (part of Asian Highway 45). People can go to several places of Kolkata, Howrah and Hooghly from here.

Bus

Private Bus
 40 Birshibpur - Serampore
 57 Kona - Howrah Station/Esplanade
 57A Chanditala - Howrah Station
 79 Panchla - Dunlop

Mini Bus
 18 Kona - Esplanade
 30 Baluhati - Esplanade
Many Shuttle Buses (Without Numbers) also pass through Khalia along National Highway 16.

Train
Kona railway station on Howrah-Amta line is the nearest railway station.

References

Cities and towns in Howrah district
Neighbourhoods in Kolkata
Kolkata Metropolitan Area